Marwin is a masculine given name. Notable people with this name include:

 Marwin Angeles (born 1991), Italian-born Filipino footballer
 Marwin Evans (born 1993), American professional gridiron football player
 Marwin González (born 1989), Venezuelan professional baseball player
 Marwin Hitz (born 1987), Swiss footballer
 Marwin Pita (born 1985), Ecuadorian footballer
 Marwin Reuvers (born 1999), Dutch footballer
 Marwin Talsma (born 1997), Dutch long track speed skater

See also
 Paul J. Marwin (1885–1931), American lawyer and politician in Minnesota
 Marvin (given name)